Semyon Anatolyevich Fomin (born 10 January 1989) is a Russian former professional footballer. He played as a midfielder.

Club career
He made his professional debut in the Russian First Division in 2008 for FC Zvezda Irkutsk. He played one game in the 2007–08 UEFA Cup for FC Lokomotiv Moscow against Panathinaikos FC.

He made his Russian Premier League debut for PFC Spartak Nalchik on 16 October 2011 in a game against FC Anzhi Makhachkala.

International career
Fomin was an integral part of the Russian U-17 squad that won the 2006 UEFA U-17 Championship.

References

External links
 

1989 births
Sportspeople from Vladivostok
Living people
Russian footballers
Russia youth international footballers
Russia national football B team footballers
FC Lokomotiv Moscow players
PFC Spartak Nalchik players
Russian Premier League players
FC Rotor Volgograd players
FC Torpedo Moscow players
FC Zvezda Irkutsk players
FC Ufa players
FC Luch Vladivostok players
Association football midfielders
FC Tom Tomsk players
FC Tyumen players
FC Torpedo Vladimir players